Locks Cove was a settlement located three miles west of St. Anthony, Newfoundland and Labrador, in Canada. The first postmistress was Gladys Rachel Elliott in 1955. It had a population of 66 in 1956.

See also
 List of communities in Newfoundland and Labrador

Ghost towns in Newfoundland and Labrador